The Fall of Chronopolis is the fifth novel by the science fiction author Barrington J. Bayley. It details the eternal conflict through time between the Chronostatic Empire and its enemy, the Hegemony.

Literary significance and reception
Rhys Hughes, in his survey of Bayley's output, described the novel as "possibly the ultimate time-travel story," noting that, unlike Collision Course, Bayley stuck to his main theme throughout.

John Clute, in the SF Encyclopedia, reviewed The Fall of Chronopolis as Bayley's most successful use of the theme of time travel.

David Pringle's review described the book as "enjoyable" and made note of the philosophy behind Bayley's intricate time paradox.

References

1974 British novels
Novels about time travel
Space opera novels
British science fiction novels
1974 science fiction novels
Novels by Barrington J. Bayley
DAW Books books
Temporal war fiction